Time to Leave is the debut extended play by Australian rock band, Cordrazine. The EP  peaked at number 42 on the ARIA charts.

The EP was re-released on vinyl in August 2020.

Track listing
 "Crazy" - 4:04
 "Time to Leave" - 3:30
 "Uncle Joe's Lament" - 5:41
 "14" - 4:48

Charts

Release history

References

1997 debut EPs
EPs by Australian artists